A by-election was held for the New South Wales Legislative Assembly electorate of West Sydney on 15 July 1877 because Sir John Robertson was appointed Colonial Secretary, forming the fourth Robertson ministry. Such ministerial by-elections were usually uncontested however on this occasion a poll was required in Central Cumberland (John Lackey and William Long), East Sydney (John Davies), Orange (Edward Combes) and West Sydney. Each minister was comfortably re-elected. Only Camden (Thomas Garrett) and Goldfields South (Ezekiel Baker) were uncontested.

Dates

Candidates
 Sir John Robertson had been a member for West Sydney since 1869, having previously represented the district from 1864 to 1866. This was the final occasion on which he was elected for the district, being defeated two months later at the 1877 election, but was then elected to both East Macquarie and Mudgee.
 Thomas White was the president of the Seamen's Union and a former secretary of the Trades and Labor Council. This was his first time standing for election to the Legislative Assembly and he would also stand unsuccessfully for West Sydney at the 1877, and 1880 elections.

Result

Sir John Robertson was appointed Colonial Secretary forming the fourth Robertson ministry.

See also
Electoral results for the district of West Sydney
List of New South Wales state by-elections

Notes

References

1877 elections in Australia
New South Wales state by-elections
1870s in New South Wales